Nebria derkraatzi is a species of ground beetle in the Nebriinae subfamily that is endemic to the Chinese capital, Beijing.

References

derkraatzi
Beetles described in 1883
Beetles of Asia
Endemic fauna of China